Welcome Break is the second studio album by Dutch indie band Pip Blom. It was released on 12 November 2021 by Heavenly Recordings.

Production
The album was self-produced by the band at Big Jelly Studios in Ramsgate, England.

Release
On 15 June 2021, Pip Blom announced the release of their second studio, originally scheduled for release on 8 October 2021. However, due to the COVID-19 pandemic, the album release was moved to 12 November 2021.

Singles
The first single "Keep It Together" was released on 15 June 2021, the same day as the album announcement. "It Should Have Been Fun", the second single from Pip Blom, was released on 15 July 2021.

On 17 August 2021, the third single "You Don't Want This" was released. The music video was directed by Sara Elzinga.

The band's fourth single "I Know I'm Not Easy to Like" was released on 9 November 2021, and lead singer Pop Blom said:
"This song feels angry, even aggressive maybe. We had so much fun recording this one. We really had to give our everything to make it as energetic as possible. We used different set-ups for the drums to be able to make it go from really small to really big in one track. It’s all about the dynamics in this one, what we’re playing is not changing that much, but we really tried to capture different sounds to keep it interesting and exciting. I’m not sure the chorus could be bigger than this one haha."

Tour
In support of the album, Pip Blom announced a tour of America, starting on 21 March 2022 at Mercury Lounge in New York, and finishing at The Pie Shop in Washington, D.C. on 1 April 2022.

Critical reception

Welcome Break was met with "generally favorable" reviews from critics. At Metacritic, which assigns a weighted average rating out of 100 to reviews from mainstream publications, this release received an average score of 78 based on eight reviews. Aggregate website AnyDecentMusic? gave the release a 7.2 out of 10 based on a critical consensus of 11 reviews.

Writing for NME, reviewer Rhys Buchanan said: "Welcome Break thrives off its simplicity and sense of joyful abandon. It's a record that will become like a familiar friend over repeated listens, and shows how the band have built elegantly on the foundations of their debut, fizzing with self-belief at every turn." Tom Dibb of Gigwise wrote: "Welcome Break isn't just chock full of hard-rocking guitars or breezy summertime bangers. It wears its sensitivities and tenderness on its sleeve. Pip Blom have exceeded the highs of even their debut LP. A record of two halves—breezy pop and introspective guitar rock—it shows a growth within the band. At DIY, Ims Taylor said of the release: "The record situates itself gorgeously in the easy-going transience suggested by its service-station-inspired title: Pip Blom follow their sunny guitars and breezy lyricism wherever they may lead, and it's all about the journey rather than the destination."

Accolades

Track listing

References

External links
 
 

2021 albums
Heavenly Recordings albums
Pip Blom albums